Grafton Primary is an Australian electro-noir band from Sydney. The band consists of brothers Benjamin and Joshua Garden who attended primary school in Grafton, New South Wales. They select drummers and bass players for live shows. Grafton Primary has independently released an EP, Relativity (2007), and two albums, Eon (2008) and Neo (2013). The group has been picked up by Triple J and has toured widely.

Members
Joshua Garden – Vocals
Benjamin Garden – Keyboards, synthesizer and programming

Discography

Studio albums

Extended plays

Singles

Awards and nominations

AIR Awards
The Australian Independent Record Awards (commonly known informally as AIR Awards) is an annual awards night to recognise, promote and celebrate the success of Australia's Independent Music sector.

|-
| rowspan="2" | 2008
|Relativity 
| Best Independent Single/EP
| 
|-
| Relativity
| Best Independent Dance/Electronic Album
| 
|-

References

2006 establishments in Australia
Australian electronic musicians
Australian musical duos
Australian new wave musical groups
Electronic music duos
Musical groups established in 2006
Musical groups from Sydney
People from Grafton, New South Wales